Tina Clayton (born 18 August 2004) is a Jamaican sprinter. She won gold medals for both the 100 metres and 4 × 100 m relay at both the 2021 and 2022 World Under-20 Championships. Clayton set a championship record in her individual event in 2022, while Jamaican women's relay team broke the world u20 record on both occasions with times of 42.94 s and 42.59 s respectively..

Tina has twin sister, Tia Clayton, who ran the anchor leg of those world records relays.

Biography
Tina Clayton attends Edwin Allen High School in Clarendon, Jamaica.

She won the girls 100 m and 4 × 100 m gold medals at the 2021 NACAC U18 Championships.

Clayton took the U20 100 m title at the 2022 CARIFTA Games in 11.22 seconds ahead of her twin sister, Tia Clayton, who earned the silver medal in 11.30. Jamaican women's 4 × 100 m relay team set there a world U20 record time which was not ratified because one of the four members of the quartet of Serena Cole, Tina Clayton, Brianna Lyston and Tia Clayton was not drug tested.

International competitions

Notes

References

External links
 

2004 births
Living people
People from Westmoreland Parish
Jamaican female sprinters
Twin sportspeople
Jamaican twins
World Athletics U20 Championships winners
21st-century Jamaican women